The 1961 NCAA Track and Field Championships were contested June 16−17 at the 40th annual NCAA-sanctioned track meet to determine the individual and team national champions of men's collegiate track and field events in the United States. This year's meet was hosted by the University of Pennsylvania at historic Franklin Field in Philadelphia.

USC claimed the team national championship, the Trojans' 21st team title.

Team Result 
 Note: Top 10 only
 (H) = Hosts

See also 
 NCAA Men's Outdoor Track and Field Championship
 1960 NCAA University Division Cross Country Championships

References

NCAA Men's Outdoor Track and Field Championship
NCAA Track and Field Championships
NCAA
NCAA Track and Field Championships